Konrad Glas (born 21 January 1940) was a German sailor who competed in the 1972 Summer Olympics.

References

1940 births
Living people
German male sailors (sport)
Olympic sailors of West Germany
Sailors at the 1972 Summer Olympics – Dragon
Place of birth missing (living people)